Venisey is a commune in the Haute-Saône department in the region of Bourgogne-Franche-Comté in eastern France.

See also
Communes of the Haute-Saône department

Geography 
The commune is located about 300 km south-east of Paris, 70 km north of Besançon, 27 km north-west of Vesoul.

Population 
The population of the commune is 136 people (2017).

References

Communes of Haute-Saône